NGC 417 is a lenticular galaxy of type SAB0− located in the constellation Cetus. It was discovered in 1886 by Francis Leavenworth. It was described by Dreyer as "extremely faint, extremely small, round."

References

External links
 

0417
Astronomical objects discovered in 1886
Cetus (constellation)
Lenticular galaxies
004237